Protein c-Fos is a proto-oncogene that is the human homolog of the retroviral oncogene v-fos. It is encoded in humans by the FOS gene. It was first discovered in rat fibroblasts as the transforming gene of the FBJ MSV (Finkel–Biskis–Jinkins murine osteogenic sarcoma virus) (Curran and Tech, 1982). It is a part of a bigger Fos family of transcription factors which includes c-Fos, FosB, Fra-1 and Fra-2. It has been mapped to chromosome region 14q21→q31. c-Fos encodes a 62 kDa protein, which forms heterodimer with c-jun (part of Jun family of transcription factors), resulting in the formation of AP-1 (Activator Protein-1) complex which binds DNA at AP-1 specific sites at the promoter and enhancer regions of target genes and converts extracellular signals into changes of gene expression. It plays an important role in many cellular functions and has been found to be overexpressed in a variety of cancers.

Structure and function 

c-Fos is a 380 amino acid protein with a basic leucine zipper region for dimerisation and DNA-binding and a transactivation domain at C-terminus, and, like Jun proteins, it can form homodimers. In vitro studies have shown that Jun–Fos heterodimers are more stable and have stronger DNA-binding activity than Jun–Jun homodimers.

A variety of stimuli, including serum, growth factors, tumor promoters, cytokines, and UV radiation induce their expression. The c-fos mRNA and protein is generally among the first to be expressed and hence referred to as an immediate early gene. It is rapidly and transiently induced, within 15 minutes of stimulation. Its activity is also regulated by posttranslational modification caused by phosphorylation by different kinases, like MAPK, CDC2, PKA or PKC which influence protein stability, DNA-binding activity and the trans-activating potential of the transcription factors. It can cause gene repression as well as gene activation, although different domains are believed to be involved in both processes.

It is involved in important cellular events, including cell proliferation, differentiation and survival; genes associated with hypoxia; and angiogenesis; which makes its dysregulation an important factor for cancer development. It can also induce a loss of cell polarity and epithelial-mesenchymal transition, leading to invasive and metastatic growth in mammary epithelial cells.

The importance of c-fos in biological context has been determined by eliminating endogenous function by using anti-sense mRNA, anti-c-fos antibodies, a ribozyme that cleaves c-fos mRNA or a dominant negative mutant of c-fos. The transgenic mice thus generated are viable, demonstrating that there are c-fos dependent and independent pathways of cell proliferation,  but display a range of tissue-specific developmental defects, including osteoporosis, delayed gametogenesis, lymphopenia and behavioral abnormalities.

Clinical significance 

The AP-1 complex has been implicated in transformation and progression of cancer. In osteosarcoma and endometrial carcinoma, c-Fos overexpression was associated with high-grade lesions and poor prognosis. Also, in a comparison between precancerous lesion of the cervix uteri and invasive cervical cancer, c-Fos expression was significantly lower in precancerous lesions. c-Fos has also been identified as independent predictor of decreased survival in breast cancer.

It was found that overexpression of c-fos from class I MHC promoter in transgenic mice leads to the formation of osteosarcomas due to increased proliferation of osteoblasts whereas ectopic expression of the other Jun and Fos proteins does not induce any malignant tumors.  Activation of the c-Fos  transgene in mice results in overexpression of cyclin D1, A and E in osteoblasts and chondrocytes, both in vitro and in vivo, which might contribute to the uncontrolled growth leading to tumor. Human osteosarcomas analyzed for c-fos expression have given positive results in more than half the cases and c-fos expression has been associated with higher frequency of relapse and poor response to chemotherapy.

Several studies have raised the idea that c-Fos may also have tumor-suppressor activity, that it might be able to promote as well as suppress tumorigenesis.  Supporting this is the observation that in ovarian carcinomas, loss of c-Fos expression correlates with disease progression. This double action could be enabled by differential protein composition of tumour cells and their environment, for example, dimerisation partners, co-activators and promoter architecture.  It is possible that the tumor suppressing activity is due to a proapoptotic function. The exact mechanism by which c-Fos contributes to apoptosis is not clearly understood, but observations in human hepatocellular carcinoma cells indicate that c-Fos is a mediator of c-myc-induced cell death and might induce apoptosis through the p38 MAP kinase pathway. Fas ligand (FASLG or FasL) and the tumour necrosis factor-related apoptosis-inducing ligand (TNFSF10 or TRAIL) might reflect an additional apoptotic mechanism induced by c-Fos, as observed in a human T-cell leukaemia cell line. Another possible mechanism of c-Fos involvement in tumour suppression could be the direct regulation of BRCA1, a well established factor in familial breast and ovarian cancer.

In addition, the role of c-fos and other Fos family proteins has also been studied in endometrial carcinoma, cervical cancer, mesotheliomas, colorectal cancer, lung cancer, melanomas, thyroid carcinomas, esophageal cancer, hepatocellular carcinomas, etc.

Cocaine, methamphetamine, morphine, and other psychoactive drugs have been shown to increase c-Fos production in the mesocortical pathway (prefrontal cortex) as well as in the mesolimbic reward pathway (nucleus accumbens), as well as display variability depending on prior sensitization. c-Fos repression by ΔFosB's AP-1 complex within the D1-type medium spiny neurons of the nucleus accumbens acts as a molecular switch that enables the chronic induction of ΔFosB, thus allowing it to accumulate more rapidly. As such, the c-Fos promoter finds utilization in drug addiction research in general, as well as with context-induced relapse to drug-seeking and other behavioral changes associated with chronic drug taking.

An increase in c-Fos production in androgen receptor-containing neurons has been observed in rats after mating.

Applications 

Expression of c-fos is an indirect marker of neuronal activity because c-fos is often expressed when neurons fire action potentials. Upregulation of c-fos mRNA in a neuron indicates recent activity.

The c-fos promoter has also been utilised for drug abuse research. Scientists use this promoter to turn on transgenes in rats, allowing them to manipulate specific neuronal ensembles to assess their role in drug-related memories and behavior. This neuronal control can be replicated with optogenetics or DREADDs

Interactions 

c-Fos has been shown to interact with:
 BCL3,
 COBRA1,
 CSNK2A1, 
 CSNK2A2, 
 DDIT3,
 	JUN
 NCOA1;,
 NCOR2,
 RELA,
 RUNX1, 
 RUNX2,
 SMAD3, and
 TBP.

See also
Leptomycin
c-Jun
Egr-1

References

Further reading

External links

Drosophila kayak - The Interactive Fly
 
 
 

Oncogenes
Transcription factors
Δ0